Malleostemon microphyllus is a plant species of the family Myrtaceae endemic to Western Australia.

It is found in the Mid West region of Western Australia between Shark Bay and Northampton where it grows in sandy soils.

References

microphyllus
Flora of Western Australia
Plants described in 2012
Taxa named by Malcolm Eric Trudgen
Taxa named by Barbara Lynette Rye